The 1987 West African Nations Cup was the 5th and the last edition of the tournament. It was held in Liberia between 30 January and 8 February. All matches were played in the capital city Monrovia.

After this edition, between 1988–2000, the tournament was never played again. It was unsuccessfully revived in 2001 as WAFU Championship. However, it was not clear whether this is a proper successor of the West African Nations Cup.

Group 1

Group 2

Knockout stages

Result

External links 
1987 West African Nations Cup - Rsssf
Statistics

West African Nations Cup
West African Nations Cup, 1987
Sport in Monrovia
West
January 1987 sports events in Africa
February 1987 sports events in Africa